State Route 56 (SR 56) is an east–west state highway in central Ohio.  Its western terminus is at SR 29 near Mutual, and its eastern terminus is at SR 682 in Athens.

Route description
SR 56 travels in a generally northwest–southeast direction in an arc around the southwestern side of Columbus. , no part of SR 56 is included within the National Highway System.

History
The route of SR 56 between Mutual and Laurelville has been included within the state highway system since 1912. In 1923, the many numbered routes were unified as SR 56 running along the route it continues to run today. By 1926, the route was extended east from its end in Laurelville to Athens running along the same route it has currently.

Major junctions

References

External links

056
Transportation in Champaign County, Ohio
Transportation in Clark County, Ohio
Transportation in Madison County, Ohio
Transportation in Pickaway County, Ohio
Transportation in Hocking County, Ohio
Transportation in Vinton County, Ohio
Transportation in Athens County, Ohio